Khalid Al-Mansour (born  1965) is a retired football striker from Saudi Arabia, who played for Al-Arabi from 1985 to 1997. He played for the Al-Arabi first team without graded in age groups in 1985 and he won the Saudi First Division with Al-Arabi five times. He was selected for the Saudi Arabia national football team in 1993 but he refused owing to personal circumstances.

See also
Football in Saudi Arabia
List of football clubs in Saudi Arabia

References

1965 births
Living people
Saudi Arabian footballers
People from Unaizah
Al-Arabi SC (Saudi Arabia) players
Association football forwards
Saudi Professional League players
Saudi First Division League players